Fritz Goro (originally Fritz Gorodiski; born 1901 in Bremen, (Germany) – died 14 December 1986 in Chappaqua, New York) was the inventor of macrophotography and a photographer specializing in science, published in the Life magazine and Scientific American, after he started his career as a photojournalist in Germany.

Goro documented many major scientific breakthroughs, including pictures of the first plutonium ever produced, the first atomic-bomb test, the advent of microelectronics, the ruby laser, as well as photos of Ali Javan timing the frequency of light at M.I.T. laboratory.

Goro was described by the evolutionary biologist Stephen Jay Gould as "the most influential photographer that science has ever known".

References

1901 births
1985 deaths
Scientists from Bremen
20th-century American photographers
People from Chappaqua, New York
20th-century American inventors